As of September 2019, the following artists were signed to Rounder Records.

Abigail Washburn
Alan Lomax Collection
Alison Krauss
Alison Krauss & Robert Plant
Alison Krauss & The Cox Family
Alison Krauss & Union Station
Allen Toussaint
Bear's Den
Béla Fleck
Billy Strings
Blackberry Smoke
Blue Highway
Bobby Osborne
Bobby Rush
Bruce Cockburn
Bryan Sutton (Sugar Hill) 
Carlene Carter
Caroline Spence
Chris Hillman
Cody Jinks
Dailey & Vincent
Dan Tyminski
Darin and Brooke Aldridge
David Bromberg
David Davis and the Warrior River Boys
Della Mae
Delta Spirit
Doc Watson
Doug Seegers
Doyle Lawson and Quicksilver
The Earls of Leicester
George Thorogood
Gibson Brothers
Gregg Allman
Honeyhoney
I'm with Her
Indigo Girls
Irma Thomas
J.D. Crowe and the New South
James Booker
James King
JD McPherson
Jelly Roll Morton
Jerry Douglas
Jillette Johnson
Katie Pruitt
Kathleen Edwards

Leon Redbone
Linda Thompson
Liz Longley (Sugar Hill)
Logan Ledger
Lonely Heartstring Band
Madeleine Peyroux
The McCrary Sisters
Michael Cleveland and Flamekeeper
Mikaela Davis
Nanci Griffith
Noam Pikelny
Norman Blake
O'Connor Band
Pete Rowan and Tony Rice
Po' Ramblin' Boys
Pokey LaFarge
Pony Brandshaw
Professor Longhair
Raffi
Rhonda Vincent
Riders in the Sky
Rush
Ruston Kelly
Sam Bush
Samantha Fish
Sarah Jarosz
Sean McConnell
Shelby Lynne
Sierra Ferrell
Sierra Hull
Son Volt
Sondre Lerche
Steep Canyon Rangers
Steve Martin
Steve Martin and Edie Brickell
Susto
Sweet Honey in the Rock
The Offspring
The Seldom Scene
The SteelDrivers
The Time Jumpers
The Tragically Hip
The War and Treaty
They Might Be Giants
Tony Rice
Tony Trischka
Woody Guthrie

Artists formerly on Rounder Records
The following is an incomplete list of artists who have released records on Rounder. 

 Darol Anger
 Etta Baker
 The Balfa Brothers
 Marcia Ball
 Russ Barenberg
 Pierre Bensusan
 Big Shoulders
 Tony Bird
 Rory Block
 Blue Rodeo
 The Blue Sky Boys
 The Bobs
 BoDeans
 Roy Book Binder
 Sandra Boynton
 Brave Combo
 Bob Brozman
 Clarence "Gatemouth" Brown
 Buckwheat Zydeco
 Solomon Burke
 JJ Cale
 Chuck Carbo
 Carter Family (Victor reissues)
 Cephas & Wiggins
 Marshall Chapman
 Vassar Clements
 Bruce Cockburn
 The Cottars
 Cowboy Junkies
 The Damnwells
 Delta Spirit
 Dennis DeYoung
 Hazel Dickens
 Disappear Fear
 Dirty Dozen Brass Band
 Michael Doucet
 Dry Branch Fire Squad
 Ronnie Earl
 John Fahey
 Cathy Fink
 Benton Flippen
 The Freight Hoppers
 J. Geils
 Jimmie Dale Gilmore
 Girl Authority
 Philip Glass
 Mike Gordon
 Bill Grant and Delia Bell
 The Grascals
 David Grier
 David Grisman
 John Hartford
 Cheb Hasni
 Juliana Hatfield
 Tish Hinojosa
 The Holy Modal Rounders
 Michael Hurley
 Do'a - Randy Armstrong & Ken LaRoche
 Mississippi John Hurt
 The Incredible Casuals
 Jack Ingram
 Cody Jinks
 Tutu Jones
 Johnson Mountain Boys
 Bill Keith
 The Kids of Widney High
 Bnois King
 King Wilkie

 Sleepy LaBeef
 David Laibman
 Lead Belly
 John Lee
 The LeRoi Brothers
 John Linnell
 Lisa Loeb
 Magic Dick
 David Mallett
 Mike Marshall
 Del McCoury
 John McCutcheon
 Natalie MacMaster
 John Mellencamp
 The Meters
 Whistlin' Alex Moore
 Lynn Morris
 Nashville Bluegrass Band
 Tracy Nelson
 Carrie Newcomer 
 NRBQ
 Alecia Nugent
 Laura Nyro
 Danny Paisley and the Southern Grass
 Ellis Paul
 Tom Paxton
 Carl Perkins
 Grant-Lee Phillips
 Pianosaurus
 Robert Plant
 Preacher Jack
 Raffi
 Ed Reavy
 Wyatt Rice
 Jonathan Richman
 Riders in the Sky
 Butch Robins
 Jimmie Rodgers (Victor reissues)
 Johnny Sansone
 Mike Seeger
 Peggy Seeger
 Amanda Shaw
 Allen Shelton
 Jon Sholle
 Junior Sisk
 Ricky Skaggs
 Smokin' Joe Kubek
 Jo-El Sonnier
 The Soul Rebels
 SteveSongs
 Don Stover
 Billy Strings
 Tut Taylor
 Ten Shekel Shirt
 Vienna Teng
 They Might Be Giants
 Happy & Artie Traum
 Dan Tyminski
 Uncle Earl
 Joe Val
 Guy Van Duser
 Loudon Wainwright III
 Martha Wainwright
 Doc Watson
 Ween
 Cheryl Wheeler
 The Wild Magnolias
 Bob Wills

References

Rounder Records artists